Francesco (de') Ficoroni (1664–1747) was an Italian connoisseur and antiquarian in Rome closely involved with the antiquities trade. He was the author of numerous publications on ancient Roman sculpture and antiquities, guides to the monuments of Rome and the city's ancient topography, and on Italian theatre and theatrical masks, among other subjects. For his antiquarian works he was made a Fellow of the Royal Society of London. A major segment of his potential audience, both for his publications and for the objects from his perpetually changing collection, was composed of British milordi on their Grand Tours. His complementary volumes on ancient and modern Rome (1744) remained in print long after his death: Thomas Jefferson purchased both volumes while he was abroad in 1785-89.

Life

Ficoroni was born near Lugnano, in the comune of Valmontone, Latium. 

From 1705 to 1710 he undertook a series of excavations along the Via Appia in the vigna Moroni, the Moroni vineyard, which revealed ninety-two funerary chambers decorated with frescoes and mosaics, which provided material for his Bolla d'oro (1736); the excavation was supported by Cardinal Filippo Antonio Gualterio, who purchased many of the antiquities discovered. Later Ficoroni bought back some of Gualterio's objects, while over two hundred of the examples of glass, terracotta oil lamps and some carved hardstones were purchased by Sir Hans Sloane and eventually found their way, with the rest of his collection, to establish the British Museum. Reasons of cost aborted the engraving of the watercolor drawings of the frescoes (now long disappeared) made for Ficoroni by Gaetano Piccini (1681–1736); the watercolors were purchased by Cardinal Gualterio but dispersed after his death in 1728. The frescos in the 92 tombs unearthed along the via Appia were visited by the painter Carlo Maratta, who brought his students to view them.

Ficoroni's excavations at Hadrian's Villa were never fully published. Carlo Fea summarised some outstanding finds in 1790. 
 
The most famous object that was in his collection or passed through his hands was the fourth-century BCE cylindrical bronze ritual vessel known still as the "Ficoroni cista", which was found in an Etruscan woman's tomb just south of Palestrina (the ancient sanctuary site of Praeneste) in 1738 and which Ficoroni gallantly presented to the museum assembled by Athanasius Kircher in the Collegio Romano. It has four finials on its lid, the figure of Dionysus flanked by aroused satyrs, and love scenes of Heracles and Iolaos.

The catalogue of his own collection of ancient Roman mercantile sealings stamped in lead was written by conte C. Gaetani and doubtless published at Ficoroni's expense.

He died in Rome.

Selected publications
Osservazioni... sopra l'antichità di Roma... dal... Padre B. de Montfaucon (Rome, 1700, 1709).
Lettera scritta al ill. Sig. G., Lord Johnstone... sovra un nuova cameo esprimente Marcello nipote di Augusto (Naples, 1718, 1726).
Le memorie più singolari di Roma e sue vicinanze,  notate in una lettera... all'Illustrissimo Cav. Bernard Inglese aggiuntavi nel fine la spiegazione d'una medaglia d'Omero (Rome, 1730).
La Bolla d'oro de fanciulli nobili Romani, e qualla de' libertini (Rome, 1732); one of the objects described is the gilded glass medallion, long considered to be a forgery, now at the Metropolitan Museum of Art.
I Tali, ed altri istromenti lusorj degli Antichi Romani (Rome, 1734)
Le Maschere sceniche e le figure comiche d'antichi Romani descritte brevemente (Rome: Antonio de' Rossi, 1736, 1748) Dedicated to nob. sig. Paolo Ippolito De Beawille. A Latin translation, De larvis scenicis, appeared in 1750 and 1754.
Breve descrizione di tre particolari statue trovatesi in Roma l'anno 1738 (Rome, no date [1738]).
Le Vestigia e rarità di Roman antica ricercate, e spiegate (Rome:G. Mainardi, 1744).
Le Singolarità di Roma moderna (Rome, 1744), a companion volume to I Tali.
Le memorie ritrovate nel territorio della prima, e seconda città di Labico e i loro giuste siti. (Rome:G. Mainardi, 1745)
Gemmae litteratae antiquae, aliequae rariores (Rome, 1757). The engraving were by P. Nicola Galeotti.

Notes

External links 
 

1664 births
1747 deaths
People from the Metropolitan City of Rome Capital
Italian antiquarians